Martti Einari Laakso (born 19 December 1943 in Ilmajoki) is a Finnish former wrestler who competed in the 1968 Summer Olympics and the 1972 Summer Olympics. His elder brother was the Finnish wrestler, Matti Laakso.

References

1943 births
Living people
Olympic wrestlers of Finland
Wrestlers at the 1968 Summer Olympics
Wrestlers at the 1972 Summer Olympics
Finnish male sport wrestlers
World Wrestling Championships medalists